"Hoochie Booty" is a song by British boy band Ultimate Kaos, from their eponymous debut album. The song was released as the second single from the album, and was a top 20 hit, peaking at No. 17 on the UK Singles Chart and No. 6 on the UK R&B Singles Chart in January 1995. In Ireland, the song peaked at No. 13.

Charts

References

1994 songs
1995 singles
Ultimate Kaos songs